The Medal of Merit is a state decoration of East Timor.  Established in 2009, it may be awarded to East Timorese and foreign civilian and military personnel.

Criteria and award procedure
The Medal of Merit recognizes civilians and military personnel, both East Timorese and foreign citizens, who have made significant contributions to national peace and stability.

The process for awarding the medal begins with a nomination from civil and military forces, by the departments of the Public Administration, and by civil society in general, which are sent to the Office of the President of East Timor.  The President selects the recipients of the medal, as supported by the Medal of Merit Committee.  The President may bestow, on an exceptional basis, this decoration without following the standard award procedures.

Notable recipients
Michael Slater
Bambang Hendarso Danuri
Tito Karnavian
Andika Perkasa
A.M. Hendropriyono
Viktor Laiskodat

See also
 Orders, decorations, and medals of Timor-Leste

References

Orders, decorations, and medals of East Timor
Awards established in 2009
2009 establishments in East Timor